Convolvulus clementii, commonly known as desert bindweed,  is a trailing perennial plant species, native to inland Australia. Mostly found on flat areas, like dune swales and claypans that are subject to seasonal inundation, in areas of open grassy woodland.

Leaves variable in shape from base to tip of stem. White or pink flowers are produced predominantly from late winter to early spring but may be seen throughout the year. 

Seeds are dark brown to grey secteroid, 3 mm long, surface rugose and covered in hairs. The collection of seeds can be done January to December.

The species was first formally described by Czech botanist Karel Domin in 1930 in Bibliotheca Botanica, based on a collection by Emile Clement between the Ashburton and De Grey Rivers.

References

External links

clementii
Flora of New South Wales
Flora of Queensland
Flora of Victoria (Australia)
Eudicots of Western Australia
Plants described in 1930